Lützow's Wild Hunt may mean:
Lützow's Wild Hunt (film), a 1927 German silent film directed by Richard Oswald
Lützow's Wild Hunt (poem), by German poet and soldier Theodor Körner